Saharni is Najwa Karam's thirteenth studio album released in 2003.

Track listing
Saharni (He Charmed Me)
Lehbayeb (The Loved One)
Edhak Lil Dounya (Smile to the world)
Chou el-Maneh (Do You Mind?)
Ma'houra Alayk (I feel sorry for you)
Hak el-Layali (Those nights)
Ketr el-Dalal (Playing hard to get)
Saharni (Instrumental)

2003 albums
Najwa Karam albums